Rassul Mamand (1944–1994) was a Kurdish politician.

Early life
Rassul Mamand was born in 1944 in Bardashan to a notable family from the Shilana Tribe. He completed primary school in Bingird District. To continue his studies, he headed to Qaladiza and then to Sulaymaniyah in Iraqi Kurdistan.

He completed his preparatory school stage in Sulaimani, where he started his political activities and became an active member of the Kurdistan Students Union. Later, he entered the College of Law at Mustansariya University.

However, he quit university while a student in the third year so that he could completely devote himself to political activities, in which he began to play a vital role.

Resistance activities
In 1968, he became the chief of Kurdistan Democratic Party in their Qaladize Office. Then, in 1970, after the March 11 Manifesto, he was assigned as the superior of Sulaimani District Council of the KDP. In 1971, he was in charge of the organizations of KDP in Halabja and then removed to Dukan.

In 1972, he became the manager of the Kirkuk Office of the KDP. After the collapse of the Kurds armed movement in 1975, he insisted on continuing the struggle and held some meetings with fellow thinkers to continue the revolution.

After they returned to Kurdistan, Rassul Mamand in cooperation with Sayda Salih Yusfi and the other strugglers, founded the Kurdistan Socialist Movement, which prolonged the revolt with the Kurdistan Ranjdaran Association.

In December 1992, the political party he led, the Kurdistan Socialist Movement was dissolved and he joined the Patriotic Union of Kurdistan. He became a member of PUK’s politburo and the head of the Akre and Duhok Centers and all the secret lines of Bahdinan. On Dec. 18, 1993, he was appointed a member of the Presidential Council of Kurdistan Region.

Rassul Mamand died on April 12, 1994, in London and was brought back to Kurdistan on April 24, and buried in his birthplace, Bardashan.

References 

Iraqi Kurdistani politicians
1944 births
1994 deaths
Kurdish nationalists